RNIE 6 is a national highway of Benin located in the east of the country.

Cities and towns
Nikki
Pèrèrè
Parakou

References

Roads in Benin